"My Pretty Pony" is a short story written by Stephen King and illustrated by the artist Barbara Kruger. It was the sixth publication in the Whitney Museum of American Art artist and writer series. An original limited coffee table book edition of 250 was published in 1989 and was an oversized fine press slip-cased book with stainless steel faced boards and digital clock inset into the front cover. A trade edition of 15,000 was later published by Alfred A. Knopf. In 1993, the story was included in King's collection Nightmares & Dreamscapes.

Plot summary

An elderly man, his death rapidly approaching, takes his young grandson up onto a hill behind his house and gives the boy his pocket watch. Then, standing among falling apple blossoms, the man also "gives instruction" on the nature of time: how when you grow up, it begins to move faster and faster, slipping away from you in great chunks if you don't hold tightly onto it. Time is a pretty pony, with a wicked heart.

Background
In his note on the story in Nightmares and Dreamscapes, King says the piece was originally a flashback scene included in a full-length novel-in-progress in which the grandson was now a brutal hitman reflecting on his childhood. The novel was intended to be published under King's Richard Bachman pseudonym, but the author grew disenchanted with the work, and finally scrapped it entirely.

King references this concept again in the "Sorry, Right Number" screenplay (also collected in Nightmares and Dreamscapes), where a direction states that a character's "pretty pony has done its fair share of running" (indicating that they have aged relatively rapidly).

Adaptations

My Pretty Pony (2009) is also a Dollar Baby short film, based on the Stephen King short story, directed by Mikhail Tank and starring Paul Marin (HD/SAG/4.4 minutes).

There is an audio version read by Jerry Garcia available on YouTube.

In May 2017, Saw star Tobin Bell will star in a short film based on the short story, directed by Luke Jaden and produced by Phil Wurtzel of Friel Films and Josh Boone.

See also
 Stephen King short fiction bibliography

Notes 

1989 short stories
Alfred A. Knopf books
Short stories adapted into films
Horror short stories
Short stories by Stephen King